Emmich is a surname. Notable people with the surname include:

 Val Emmich (born 1979), American writer, singer-songwriter, and actor
 Otto von Emmich (1848–1915), Prussian general
 Cliff Emmich (1936–2022), American actor

See also
 Emich